Thomas Simons (born 9 April 2004), better known as TommyInnit, is an English YouTuber and Twitch streamer. He produces Minecraft-related videos and live streams, including collaborations with fellow YouTubers and streamers in the Dream SMP, which caused his YouTube and Twitch channels to increase in popularity. , his seven YouTube channels have collectively reached over  million subscribers and over  billion views; his two Twitch channels have reached over  million followers, making him the most-followed Minecraft channel on Twitch, as well as the 14th most-followed overall.

Early life 
Thomas Simons was born in Nottingham, England on 9 April 2004.

Career

YouTube 
Simons created his first YouTube channel, Channelnutpig, on 15 February 2013 and his TommyInnit channel on 24 December 2015. He uploaded his first video on his TommyInnit channel in September 2018. Simons typically uploads videos consisting of him playing Minecraft.

On 6 August 2019, Simons uploaded his first video relating to SkyBlock, a minigame on Minecraft server Hypixel. On 4 July 2020, Simons joined the Dream SMP, a roleplay-focused Minecraft server run by eponymous YouTuber Dream.

On 1 April 2021, Simons created a new YouTube channel under his own name, uploading the first video onto it two months later.

Twitch 
Simons began streaming on Twitch in late 2018, where he regularly streams Minecraft and Just Chatting.

On 20 January 2021, Simons live streamed the finale of the Dream SMP, titled The Dream SMP Finale, which peaked at over 650,000 viewers, making it the third-highest all-time concurrent viewer livestream on Twitch, overtaking Ninja's Fortnite collaboration with Drake.

Other 

On 1 July 2022, Simons performed a live special titled TommyInnit & Friends at the Brighton Dome. The show included many other popular internet personalities, including DanTDM, Jacksepticeye, JackManifoldTV, Nihachu, and others, as well as a tribute to Technoblade, whose death was announced early the same day.

On 4 August 2022, Simons announced a book that he had been writing with fellow YouTuber and Twitch streamer Wilbur Soot titled TommyInnit Says...The Quote Book. The book was released on 13 October 2022. All of the sales money from the book is being donated to the Sarcoma Foundation of America in honour of Simons' and Gold's late friend Technoblade, to whom the book was also dedicated.

Personal life 
In September 2021, Simons announced that he would move to Brighton in 2022.

On 19 November 2022, Simons released a video on his main YouTube channel, announcing to his audience that he has a girlfriend. Her face and real name were not revealed. She instead goes by the nickname "Em".

Awards and nominations

Filmography

Music video

Bibliography

See also 

List of YouTubers
List of most-followed Twitch channels

Notes

References

External links 
 
 

Living people
2004 births
2015 establishments in the United Kingdom
21st-century British people
British YouTubers
English-language YouTube channels
Gaming-related YouTube channels
Gaming YouTubers
Twitch (service) streamers
YouTube channels launched in 2015
English video bloggers
Streamer Award winners
Minecraft YouTubers